Baku City Executive Committee (Russian: Бакинский городской исполнительный комитет [Bakinskiy gorodskoy ispolnitel'nyi komitet], commonly known as Bakgorispolkom (Бакгорисполком)) was the main administrative institution of Baku during the Soviet period. Bakgorispolkom was headed by the presidium and consisted of the Chief Architecture Department and Town-planning Council. The head of BCEC was actually the city mayor.

Heads of BCEC

References

History of Baku
Government of the Soviet Union